Nikolay Ivanovich Demidov (19 August 1773 – 4 June 1833) was a Russian General of Infantry, Adjutant-General and senator.

Life
From a noble family in Ryazan province, he was the son of Brigadier Ivan Ivanovich Demidov. As was the custom of the time his birth was recorded with the Preobrazhensky Lifeguard regiment and three years later promoted to Sergeant. He entered active service on 1 January 1790, rising to captain in 1798 and colonel in 1799. In 1803 he was made a major general and placed in the Izmaylovsky Regiment before being made head of the Petrovsky Infantry Regiment on May 16, with which he marched into Prussia during the Franco-Russian War early in 1807, though he did not participate in hostilities. Also in 1807 he formed the Libavskogo Infantry Regiment. In 1808 he joined the Russian army sent to the Finnish War, where he was put in charge of 2 infantry battalions and 200 Cossacks to besiege Vaasa.

1773 births
1833 deaths
Imperial Russian Army generals
Politicians of the Russian Empire
Recipients of the Order of St. Vladimir, 3rd class
Recipients of the Order of St. George of the Third Degree
Nikolay Ivanovich
Place of birth missing